The 2012–13 WCHA women's ice hockey season marked the continuation of the annual tradition of competitive ice hockey among Western Collegiate Hockey Association members.

Regular season

News and notes

September

October

November

December

January

February

Standings

In-season honors

Players of the week

Defensive players of the week

Rookies of the week

WCHA playoffs

Awards and honors

References

See also
 National Collegiate Women's Ice Hockey Championship

WCHA
Western Collegiate Hockey Association